Markus Vinzent (born 1959) is a historian of religion (specializing in early Christianity, Patristics and Medieval Studies, Historiography, Retromodernity, Religion and Business). He is professor in the Department of Theology & Religious Studies at King's College London, and fellow of the Max Weber Center for Advanced Social and Cultural Studies, Erfurt, Germany.

Biography 

Vinzent studied philosophy, theology, Jewish studies, ancient history, and archaeology at the Universities of Eichstätt, Paris (Diplom, Philosophy and Theology, 1978–83), Ludwig-Maximilians-Universität, Munich, Germany (Ph.D., 1987–91), and Ruprecht-Karls Universität Heidelberg, Germany (Postdoctoral research, Habilitation, 1991-5). He worked as a pastor between 1984 and 1991, and from the 1990s onward he has also been a serial entrepreneur (IT, Internet, HR, energy, waste, utilities and infrastructure).

Vinzent has held academic posts as senior research fellow at King's College, Cambridge (1991-3), senior research fellow at the Berlin-Brandenburgische Akademie der Wissenschaft (tenure), Berlin (1993-5), C4-professor (non-tenure) for history of theology in the times of the Reformation and Modernity, University of Mainz, Germany (1996-7), C4-professor for history of theology (tenure), University of Cologne, Germany (1997-9), HG Wood Professor of Theology, University of Birmingham (1999-2010), including a stint as head of department (1999-2001). He joined the Department of Theology and Religious Studies at King's College London in September 2010. During the years 2010 to 2015 he served as Adjunct Professor of Korea University, Seoul. Since 2012 he is Fellow of the Max Weber Centre for Advanced Social and Cultural Studies, Erfurt University. Additionally, in 2015/2016 Fellow of TOPOI, Humboldt University Berlin, and in 2017/2018 Guest scholar at Augsburg University, Germany.

In 2003 he initiated and co-authored the Birmingham study with Guidelines on the ‘Trialogue of Cultures’ as a result of a major 8-European-country study of teaching and learning about Islam, Judaism and Christianity in schools, funded by the ALTANA/BMW-Foundation (Herbert-Quandt-Stiftung) with a major research grant (2000-2002). This resulted in the creation of a 10-year initiative by the foundation in which during the years 2005 to 2015 around 200 German schools took part in a trialogue competition. The aim was, based on the Guidelines to develop creative projects in schools for a better co-cultural-living. The results have led to a list of publications, a children broadcast teaching course by the Hessischer Rundfunk and various other media.

Together with Professor Allen Brent, he has directed the major research project on 'Early Christian Iconography and Epigraphy', a project generously funded by the British Academy (2011–12); as prime investigator he was running the Arts and Humanities Research Council (AHRC) funded major research project on ‘Meister Eckhart and the early 14th century Parisian University’ (2013-2016) following his re-discovery of new Parisian Questions of this medieval philosopher and theologian. He is now co-leading together with Marie-Anne Vannier (Université de Lorraine, Metz) a major research project on ‘Teaching and Preaching with Patristic auctoritates – Meister Eckhart in France and Germany, past and present’, funded by the French Agence National de la Recherche (ANR) and the Deutsche Forschungsgemeinschaft (DFG) (2018-2021).

In 2020 he was given the prestigious scholarly price, the Chair Gutenberg, by the University of Strasbourg and the Cercle Gutenberg. http://www.cercle-gutenberg.fr/titulaires-et-laureats/titulaires-chaires-gutenberg/biographie-des-laureats/chaires-2019/vinzent-markus/
 
Since 2003 he has served as one of the directors of the International Conference on Patristic Studies, is editor-in-chief of Studia Patristica, the conference's official publication, has initiated and is editor of the series Studia Patristica Supplements and of the series Eckhart: Texts and Studies. 

Vinzent is board member of the Eckhart Gesellschaft (2016-), and member of a series of academic societies, the European Academy of Science (Vienna, 2001-), the Academia Europaea (London, 2015-), the Eckhart Society (2011-), International Society of Neoplatonic Studies (2012-), Internationale Gesellschaft für Theologische Mediävistik (2014-), Oswald von Wolkenstein-Gesellschaft (2017-).

Writings 
 Christi Thora. Die Entstehung des Neuen Testaments im 2. Jahrhundert, Freiburg i.Br., Herder, 2022
 [together with Loris Sturlese] Meister Eckhart, The German Works. 56 Homilies for the Liturgical Year. 2. De sanctis, Eckhart: Texts and Studies 12, Leuven, Peeters Publishers, 2019, 
 [together with Loris Sturlese] Meister Eckhart, The German Works. 64 Homilies for the Liturgical Year. 1. De tempore, Eckhart: Texts and Studies 9, Leuven, Peeters Publishers, 2019,  
 Offener Anfang. Die Entstehung des Christentums im 2. Jahrhundert. Herder Verlag, Freiburg i.Br. 2019, 
 Writing the History of Early Christianity. From Reception to Retrospection Cambridge University Press, Cambridge 2019, 
 [together with Kelley McCarthy Spoerl] Eusebius of Caesarea, Against Marcellus and Ecclesiastical Theology, Translation with notes by Kelley McCarthy Spoerl and Markus Vinzent, The Fathers of the Church (Chicago: The Catholic University of America Press, 2017).
 Tertullian’s Preface on Marcion’s Gospel, Studia Patristica Supplements, 5 (Leuven: Peeters, 2016).
 [together with Loris Sturlese] Index Eckhardianus: Meister Eckhart und seine Quellen I Die Bibel, Meister Eckhart. Lateinische und Deutsche Werke. Die lateinischen Werke VI, 1.-6. Lieferung (Stuttgart: Kohlhammer, 2015).
 Die Auferstehung Christi im frühen Christentum (Freiburg i.Br., 2014), German translation and revised version of M12.  
 M15. Marcion and the Dating of the Synoptic Gospels, Studia Patristica Supplements 2 (Leuven: Peeters, 2014).  See also the Chinese translation in the series ‘Classics and Interpretations’, trans. Shuhong Zheng (Beijing: Huaxia Publishing House, 2016). 
 Meister Eckhart’s On the Lord’s Prayer: Introduction, Text, Translation, and Commentary (Leuven: Peeters, 2012). 
 Christ's Resurrection in Early Christianity and the Making of the New Testament, (Ashgate, 2011). 
 The Art of Detachment, (Leuven: Peeters, 2011). 
 Der Ursprung des Apostolikums im Urteil der kritischen Forschung, Forschungen zur Kirchen- und Dogmengeschichte Band 89, (Göttingen: Vandenhoeck & Ruprecht, 2006). 
 Markell von Ankyra, Die Fragmente; Der Brief an Julius von Rom, Supplements to Vigiliae Christianae 39 (Leiden: Brill, 1997). 
 Pseudo-Athanasius, Contra Arianos IV. Eine Schrift gegen Asterius von Kappadokien, Eusebius von Cäsarea, Markell von Ankyra und Photin von Sirmium, Supplements to Vigiliae Christianae 36 (Leiden: E.J. Brill, 1996). 
 Asterius von Kappadokien, Die Theologischen Fragmente, Supplements to Vigiliae Christianae 20 (Leiden: E.J. Brill, 1993).

Contributions 

In a series of monographs he has published on early Christian beliefs (Monarchianism, Trinity, Apostles' Creed) and their reception in the Middle Ages, the Enlightenment and in contemporary theology. His main contribution to the field of historical theology is his radical attempt to read sources non-anachronistically. As a result, Christianity is seen as a religion which developed its contours much later than previously assumed. In his recent monograph on the Resurrection, he argues that its foundational writings, especially the canonical and non-canonical Gospels, all stem from the middle of the second century, and even Paul's letters, written around the mid first century, only became influential a hundred years later. The Roman teacher and businessman Marcion of Sinope is identified as one of the key thinkers and founders of Christianity. Key concepts like Christianity as a separate 'religion', being based not only on sayings of a Rabbi Jesus, but on the exemplary life of a divine messenger and saviour Jesus Christ who died on the cross and rose again, the 'Gospel' as a new literary genre that encapsulates the novelty of Christ's message and of Christianity, the 'New Testament' as the title of the collection of the foundational writings of this new religion (in antithesis to the 'Old Testament' of the Jewish law and the prophets), the introduction of sacraments, new ways of fasting and asceticism all go back to this Roman teacher.

Similarly, Vinzent has shown that the Christian Creed is a later development and, like that of Christian festivals (except Easter which was adopted from Judaism, but was radically altered by Marcion – a change which was adopted only at a time when the other festivals were introduced) is a product of the fourth century. Especially the Apostles' Creed seems to have derived from the dogmatic disputes in 340 AD.

On the basis of Vinzent's views, the early history and the nature of Christianity looks very different from our common understanding. Christianity developed as one of the Jewish sects and did not move beyond this framework before the reconceptualization by Marcion of Sinope in the years after 140 AD. Moreover, the various theologies and communities that mushroomed from the mid second century became gradually influenced by the 'Gospel(s)' and 'Paul'.

A more recent research area of Vinzent is Meister Eckhart (c. 1260–1329), his writings and thinking. Vinzent argues that Eckhart was an extraordinarily creative Christian thinker who re-conceptualized almost every key idea of his religion. He shows that Eckhart challenged even core concepts like the 'Trinity', the 'Fall', the 'Sacraments' and other ideas that normally are taken for granted as being central to Christianity.

In the latter field he has contributed major studies, but also discoveries of new texts by Meister Eckhart (four more Parisian Questions and others), provided the Biblical Index to the critical edition of Eckhart’s works in the Klostermann edition (Stuttgart), editions, translations and commentaries to Eckhart’s works. As a result, Eckhart is embedded more deeply within the discourse of the late 13th and early 14th century discourse of scholasticism at the University of Paris, Oxford and Erfurt. Moreover, it became clear that Eckhart was not only one of the most successful and debated preachers with a great impact on the development of his vernacular middle high German language, but that he was also a sought after and highly recognized University master with his Latin works. In a very recent new manuscript discovery at the Wartburg Castle of Eisenach, Germany, Eckhart’s own vernacular translation of some of his Latin works seems to be preserved (with a parallel codex in Berlin and fragments in Munich).

Both subject areas link to Vinzent's attempt to push the boundaries of theology and to develop a radical transformational theology by which this subject such as the resurrection are understood as being principally open to challenge, criticism and reformulation. He claims that theology is measured against its natural claim of dealing with the very first principle(s) and truth. As such, it cannot be conceived as a closed system, but needs to be co-essential with that of its own object.

His latest research pertains to historiographical methodology. Influenced by the sociological debates of modernity, particularly through his fellowship at the Max Weber Kolleg, Erfurt, he reflected on the various turns (cultural turn, material turn), and developed his anachronological criticism further in his project on ‘Retrospection’. In this he highlights the paradox between the retrospective nature of any writing of history and the progressive form of language and any form of narrative, including that of history.

Markus Vinzent and the Bearing of Marcion on the Early Church and the Origins of the Gospel

Markus Vinzent is the head of the research project at the Max Weber Centre for Advanced Cultural and Social Studies on the place of Marcion of Sinope in the development of the gospel genre. The project, entitled ‘The Gospel of Marcion: The Beginnings of Christianity’, proceeds from the premise that the four canonical gospels of the New Testament were composed in the first-century and were canonised following the end of the second-century AD. The project brings into question the scholarly consensus surrounding the dating and redaction history of the canonical gospels, to show that the teacher and naval merchant, Marcion, was the first to compile a work of literature recognisable today as belonging to the gospel tradition. The predominant language of Marcion’s home region, Sinope, a Bithynian-Pontian Roman province, is widely accepted to be Pontiac Greek, a dialect of Ancient Greek, although it remains yet unknown, whether or not Marcion was fluent in the language. 

Vinzent (2014) argues, that the core writings of the New Testament were likely heavily redacted, if not outright created, in the second-century AD, namely the canonical gospels (as well as the non-canonical gospels), which stem from the middle of the second-century AD, the Pauline Epistles (going back to Paul, but severely redacted when further ‘Pauline’ letters and Acts were added). Even further redactions followed in the second-century, when the texts were gathered to form the collection of the New Testament. The Roman teacher and merchant, Marcion of Sinope, is regarded by Christianity as one of its key thinkers and founders, and is associated with the first compilation of a gospel and 10 Pauline letters. Vinzent’s views stand apart from the conventional understanding of scholarship. The early Church first developed itself out of a ‘Jewish sect’, but it failed to shed its Jewish trappings until Marcion reinterpreted it in the years following 140 AD. For Vinzent, it was Marcion, who through the corpus of the ten Pauline Epistles and his one Gospel, helped to spread the belief in the Resurrection of Christ throughout Christendom. 

Thus Marcion’s Gospel is taken to be the historical font for each of the four canonical gospels, because they consult Marcion as their source. In his own words, Marcion created the literary genre of the gospel tradition and gave his work its name, all whilst without historical precedent in the attachment of the name of this genre to the story of Jesus. Through the collected texts of his Gospel and the ten Pauline Epistles, which he came to publish as ‘the New Testament’, the first collection ever to take this name, Marcion gave a previously ‘Jewish sect’ an increasingly Christian profile, thus setting in motion their establishment into the institutional environment of the Roman world, in that Christianity had finally come to shed its Jewish identity. In the introduction to his New Testament, Marcion copies Tertullian’s example, and denounces the four later canonical gospels as plagiarism. Thus Vinzent thinks that from this, the basis was created for the establishment of the Pauline Epistles as canon, through the connection of the later four canonical gospels with origins of the wider New Testament, in which the Acts of the Apostles are found at the end. Markus’s project enjoys a scholarly connection to reconstructions of the Gospel of Marcion undertaken by Theodor Zahn, Adolf von Harnack, Dieter T. Roth, and Matthias Klinghardt. 

According to Vinzent, Marcion placed the Resurrection of Christ at the centre of Christian belief in the second-century, through his rediscovery of Paul and the publication of the ten Pauline Epistles, in conjunction with his gospel, which was later condemned by opponents as a variation of the Gospel of Luke. Further still in his analysis, Vinzent holds that the Resurrection of Christ became an important element of belief only in those circles most influenced by the writings of Paul and the Gospel of Marcion. 

For Vinzent, the ‘Gospel of Marcion’ was initially composed for teaching, and not publication, however, as soon as it was published, it was heavily plagiarised by several teachers and scribes, and then revised for publication into several different editions under the guise of various pseudonymous attributions to the Apostles and their disciples. 

Vinzent supports the investigation of David Trobisch and Matthias Klinghardt (2011), which examines the origin of the post-Marconite gospels as ‘canonical redaction’. According to Klinghardt, the compilation of the 27 individual articles into a single literary unit is supposedly not the result of a coherent process of collection and selective procuration, but much rather the product of a single, or even multiple redactors. Vinzent combines these assumptions with the hypothesis, in that the redaction followed as a reaction to the Gospel of Marcion, and amongst other things, that it embodied an anti-Marconian current, which supposedly means that it was intended to be understood as a response to Marcion and as an alternative written in opposition to his condemned gospel. Vinzent sees evidence of this editorial intention in the writings of Origen of Alexandria, Irenaeus of Lyon, Tertullian, and Justin the Martyr. Thus Vinzent presents the following points: 

• Marcion created the first so-called ‘gospel’ and the first ‘New Testament’. He also assumed, amongst other things, that the origin of the gospel was an active oral tradition in Rome.

• Marcion is strongly associated with the intellectual tradition of Middle Platonism.

• Marcion’s New Testament consisted of the following texts: the Gospel of Marcion, the Epistles to Galatians, First Thessalonians, Second Thessalonians, Romans, First Corinthians, Second Corinthians, Laodiceans, Colossians, Philippians, and Philemon.

• Although originally compiled for his own teaching, the text of the Gospel of Marcion reached a far wider audience than first intended and was subsequently plagiarised, revised, and distilled into pseudoepigraphia attributed to pseudonyms, e.g., Mark, Matthew, Luke, and John, but also to other prominent authorities, i.e., Peter.

• Because of this situation, Marcion was likely to have felt himself compelled, firstly to publish the texts of the Pauline Epistles and the Gospel, and secondly, to provide the collection with a preliminary introduction, i.e., disclamatory statement. In these statements, Marcion points to the inconsistency of his ‘New (Marconite) Gospel’ with its inclusion alongside the Hebrew Bible and its reconstruction in pseudoepigraphia by Jewish writers.

• The Gospel of Mark, unlike the Gospels of Matthew and Luke, only broadly follows the structure of the Gospel of Marcion, in that Mark does not include an account of Jesus’s childhood. On the other hand, the redactor of Luke maintains the closest resemblance to the text of the Gospel of Marcion, appearing unexpectedly to have been simultaneously influenced by previous redactions to the Gospels, which also find their root in the ‘Gospel of Marcion’. Otherwise, the Ascension of Christ is set at the end of the Gospel by the redactor, and the Gospel of Matthew greatly extends the childhood and adolescence stories of Jesus and embeds several references to the Torah and the Prophets into them.

References

External links 
Markus Vinzent, King's College London faculty page
Ashgate Markus Vinzent author page

1959 births
Living people
20th-century German historians
Academics of King's College London
Religion academics
Members of the European Academy of Sciences and Arts
People from Saarbrücken
University of Paris alumni
Ludwig Maximilian University of Munich alumni
Academic staff of Johannes Gutenberg University Mainz
Academic staff of the University of Cologne
Academics of the University of Birmingham
German male non-fiction writers
21st-century German historians